"Riot" is a song by Canadian rock band Three Days Grace. It was released on November 6, 2007 as the fourth and final single from the album One-X. The song peaked at number 65 in Canada, and number 12 and 21 on the US Mainstream Rock and Modern Rock charts respectively. The single was certified Platinum in both Canada and the United States respectively in 2018.

Background
The song is about protesting against the negative things in life  and was inspired by vocalist Adam Gontier's anger when he was in rehab for OxyContin addiction. The song was also featured in the video game WWE SmackDown vs. Raw 2007 along with "Animal I Have Become" as an edited version. 

It is one of only a few songs by the band to feature profanity. During radio play, the line "If you feel so filthy, so dirty, so fucked up", "fucked" is replaced with "messed", and in the WWE SmackDown vs. Raw 2007 video game, the word "fuck" in that line is backmasked so that it sounds somewhat like "if you feel so filthy, so dirty, so huffed up".

Track listing

Personnel

Three Days Grace
Adam Gontier – lead vocals, rhythm guitar
Barry Stock – lead guitar
Brad Walst – bass
Neil Sanderson – drums, backing vocals

Production
Howard Benson – producer
Chris Lord-Alge – mixing
Ted Jensen – mastering
Mike Plotnikoff – recording
Michael Tedesco – A&R

Charts

Weekly charts

Year-end charts

Certifications

References

External links

Three Days Grace songs
2007 singles
2006 songs
Songs written by Adam Gontier
Jive Records singles
Songs about drugs